The Tasmantid  Seamount Chain is a  long chain of seamounts in the South Pacific Ocean. It is one of the two parallel seamount chains alongside the East Coast of Australia; the Lord Howe and Tasmantid seamount chains both run north-south through parts of the Coral Sea and Tasman Sea. These chains have longitudes of approximately 159°E and 156°E respectively.

Like its neighbour, the Tasmantid Seamount Chain has resulted from the Indo-Australian Plate moving northward over a stationary hotspot. It ranges in age from 40 to 6 million years old. Alternative names for the Tasmantid Seamount Chain include the Tasmantid Seamounts, Tasman Seamounts, Tasman Seamount Chain, Tasmantide Volcanoes or simply the Tasmantids.

Features
The Tasmantid Seamount Chain includes the following:

Barcoo Bank 
Brisbane Guyot 
Britannia Guyots 
Cato Reef 
Derwent Hunter Guyot 
Fraser Seamount 
Gascoyne Seamount 
Kenn Reef 
Moreton Seamount 
Queensland Guyot 
Recorder Guyot 
Stradbroke Seamount 
Taupo Bank 
Wreck Reefs

References 

Seamount chains
Guyots
Hotspot tracks
Volcanoes of Australia
Seamounts of the Pacific Ocean
Landforms of the Coral Sea
Tasman Sea
Miocene volcanoes
Seamounts of the Tasman Sea
Volcanoes of the Tasman Sea